Truman is a given name. Notable people with the name include:

Truman H. Aldrich (1848–1932), American politician
Truman Smith Baxter (1867–1931), Canadian politician
Truman Bewley (born 1941), American economist
Truman Boardman (1810–1895), American politician
Truman Bodden (born 1945), Caymanian politician
Truman Bradley (Native American) (died 1900), Schaghticoke Native American who lived in the village of Nichols Farms in Trumbull, Connecticut
Truman Bradley (actor) (1905–1974), American actor and narrator
Truman W. Brophy (1848–1928), American dentist
Truman Capote (1924–1984), American author
Truman Chafin (born 1945), American politician
Truman W. Collins (1902–1964), American businessman, civic leader, and philanthropist
Truman H. DeLap (1885–1974), American politician
Truman C. Everts (1816–1901), American explorer
Truman Enos (1777–1858), American politician
Truman Futch (1891–1960), American politician
Truman Gibson (1912–2005), American businessman, attorney, government advisor, and boxing promoter
Truman Hart (1784–1838), American politician
Truman Head (1809–1875), Union Army soldier
Truman H. Hoag (1816–1870), American politician
Truman Ward Ingersoll (1862–1922), American photographer
Truman H. Judd (1817–1884), American politician
Truman Kimbro (1919–1944), American soldier
Truman H. Landon (1905–1986), American air force general
Truman Lowe (1944–2019), Ho-Chunk artist
Truman G. Madsen (1926–2009), American religious philosopher
Truman Michelson (1879–1938), American linguist
Truman J. Nelson (1911–1987), American writer
Truman Handy Newberry (1864–1945), American politician
Truman O. Olson (1917–1944), American soldier
Truman B. Ransom (1802–1847), American educator and military officer
Truman Reeves (1840–1924), American politician
Truman Henry Safford (1836–1901), American calculating prodigy
Truman Seymour (1824–1891), American general
Truman Smith (1791–1884), American politician
Truman Smith (officer) (1893–1970), American infantry officer
Truman Spain (1913–1968), American football tackle
Truman Spangrud (born 1934), American general
Truman Taylor (born 1932), American television host
Truman F. Wilbanks (1891–1967), American football player and coach
Truman "True" Williams (1839–1897), American illustrator
Truman G. Younglove (1815–1882), American politician
Truman G. Yuncker (1891–1964), American botanist

Fictional characters
 Truman Burbank, fictional character in the film The Truman Show
 Truman Motley, fictional character in the 1976-2000 comic strip Motley's Crew
 Truman X, fictional character in the television series The X's
 Truman Tomten, fictional character in the television series Noddy

See also
Truman (surname)

English masculine given names